Pursuit is a 1972 film produced by Shaw Brothers studio, directed Cheng Kang, starring Yueh Hua, Wang Chin Feng and Fan Mei Sheng.

References 

1972 films
Hong Kong action films
1970s action films
Mandarin-language films
Shaw Brothers Studio films
Films based on Water Margin
1970s Hong Kong films